J. Francis Kellogg House is a historic home located at Avon in Livingston County, New York.  It is a Colonial Revival–style dwelling with Arts and Crafts influenced detailing constructed in 1908.  It is a -story, square, frame residence with a flat topped hipped roof with dormers.

It was listed on the National Register of Historic Places in 1978.

References

Houses on the National Register of Historic Places in New York (state)
Colonial Revival architecture in New York (state)
Houses completed in 1908
Houses in Livingston County, New York
National Register of Historic Places in Livingston County, New York
1908 establishments in New York (state)